Four Girls in White is a 1939 drama film directed by S. Sylvan Simon, starring Florence Rice and Una Merkel. It follows the mostly comical exploits of four nursing students enrolled in a three-year training course.

Plot
Student nurses at a large urban hospital cope with life's problems and career issues.

Cast
 Florence Rice as Norma Page
 Una Merkel as Robbins
 Ann Rutherford as Pat Page
 Mary Howard as Mary Forbes
 Alan Marshal as Dr. Steve Melford
 Kent Taylor as Bob Maitland
 Buddy Ebsen as Express, an orderly
 Jessie Ralph as Miss Tobias
 Sara Haden as Miss Bennett
 Phillip Terry as Dr. Sidney
 Tom Neal as Dr. Phillips

Production
The working titles for this film were Women in White and Diary of a Nurse, and it was filmed between December 5, 1938 and January 3, 1939.

Parody
On April 4, 1939 Jack Benny and his ensemble performed a parody of "Four Girls in White" on "The JELL-O Program".

References

External links 
 
 
 
 

1939 films
Metro-Goldwyn-Mayer films
Films directed by S. Sylvan Simon
American black-and-white films
Films produced by Nat Levine
American drama films
1939 drama films
1930s English-language films
1930s American films